S330 may refer to :
 Sendo S330, a Sendo mobile phone.
 Canon S330, a Canon Digital IXUS camera model.
 Canon S330, a Canon S-series inkjet printer.